Gymkhana are social and sporting clubs in India and other Asian countries.

Gymkhana may also refer to:
 Gymkhana (equestrian), an equestrian competition
 Gymkhana (motorsport), an event also known as "car rodeo"
 Gymkhana (motorcycle), a motorcycle time trial around cones on a paved area.